Edward Antony James Bulwer-Lytton, Viscount Knebworth (13 May 1903 – 1 May 1933) was a British pilot and Conservative politician.

Knebworth was the eldest son of Victor Bulwer-Lytton, 2nd Earl of Lytton, and his wife, Pamela, daughter of Sir Trevor Chichele-Plowden. Lady Hermione Lytton was his sister. He was educated at Eton and Oxford University. He worked briefly as a stockbroker in London before taking up a post in the Education Department of the Central Conservative Office. Knebworth unsuccessfully contested the Labour stronghold of Shoreditch in 1929, but was returned to Parliament for Hitchin in 1931. 

The latter year, he also joined the Royal Auxiliary Air Force and qualified as a pilot the following year. He served with the force's 601 (County of London) Squadron.

It was while serving with the Auxiliary Air Force that Lord Knebworth was killed in the crash of a Hawker Hart at Hendon on 1 May 1933, aged  29. He was taking part in a practice flight for the upcoming annual air pageant there when his plane failed to pull out of dive and hit the ground, also killing his crewman.  His younger brother Alexander was killed at the Second Battle of El Alamein in 1942 and their uncle Neville Bulwer-Lytton later succeeded in the earldom.

References

Brief biography and portrait (by John Singer Sargent) of Viscount Knebworth as a child

Further reading
 The Earl of Lytton, Antony: A Record Of Youth (foreword by J.M. Barrie).  London: Peter Davies Ltd., 1935.

External links

 

1903 births
1933 deaths
Conservative Party (UK) MPs for English constituencies
UK MPs 1931–1935
People educated at West Downs School
Heirs apparent who never acceded
British courtesy viscounts
Aviators killed in aviation accidents or incidents in England
People educated at Eton College
Alumni of the University of Oxford